Ethonam is an antifungal agent.

Synthesis

2-Aminotetralin is alkylated with ethylchloroacetate to afford the glycine derivative. Heating with formic acid then affords the amide (2). This compound is then reacted with ethyl formate to yield hydroxymethylene ester (3). Rxn with isothiocyanic acid gives the imidazole-2-thiol (5). {The sequence may involve first hydrolysis of the formamido group, followed by addn of the amine to isothiocyanic acid; cyclization of the thiourea nitrogen with the formyl function would complete formation of the heterocycle.} Desulfurization by means Raney-Nickel finishes the synthesis of ethnonam (6).

References 

Antifungals
Ethyl esters
Imidazoles
1-Aminotetralins